Coatecas Altas Zapotec is a Zapotec language spoken in southern Oaxaca, Mexico, in and around the town of Coatecas Altas, in the Ejutla District, south of Oaxaca City. It is 83% intelligible with Ozolotepec Zapotec, and similar to Miahuatlán Zapotec.

Communities of Coatecas Altas speakers can also be found in Soconusco, Chiapas, San Bernardino, Oaxaca, and in the areas surrounding San Quintín, Baja California.

References

External links 
OLAC resources in and about the Coatecas Altas Zapotec language

Coatecas Altas language resources

Zapotec languages

Languages of Mexico
Oto-Manguean languages